Yungia is a genus of flatworms.

Species
Yungia aurantiaca (Delle Chiaje, 1822)
Yungia dicquemari (Risso, 1818)
Yungia teffi Dawydoff, 1952

References 

Turbellaria genera